The secretary of the Air Force, sometimes referred to as the secretary of the Department of the Air Force, (SecAF, or SAF/OS) is the head of the Department of the Air Force and the service secretary for the United States Air Force and United States Space Force. The secretary of the Air Force is a civilian appointed by the president, by and with the advice and consent of the Senate. The secretary reports to the secretary of defense and/or the deputy secretary of defense, and is by statute responsible for and has the authority to conduct all the affairs of the Department of the Air Force.

The secretary works closely with their civilian deputy, the under secretary of the Air Force; and their military deputies, the chief of staff of the Air Force and the chief of space operations.

The first secretary of the Air Force, Stuart Symington, was sworn in on September 18, 1947, upon the split and re-organization of the Department of War and Army Air Forces into an air military department and a military service of its own, with the enactment of the National Security Act.

On July 26, 2021 the United States Senate confirmed Frank Kendall III as the next Secretary of the Air Force. On July 28, 2021, Kendall was sworn in as the 26th Secretary of the Air Force.

Responsibilities
The secretary is the head of the Department of the Air Force. The Department of the Air Force is defined as a Military Department. It is not limited to the Washington headquarters staffs, rather it is an entity which includes all the components of the United States Air Force and United States Space Force, including their reserve components:

They include, but are not limited to:

Air Force and Space Force units while assigned to Combatant Commands may only be reassigned by authority of the secretary of defense.

However, the chain of command for Air Force and Space Force units for other purposes than the operational direction goes from the president to the secretary of defense to the secretary of the Air Force to the commanders of Air Force and Space Force Commands. Air Force and Space Force officers have to report on any matter to the secretary, or the secretary's designate, when requested. The secretary has the authority to detail, prescribe the duties, and to assign Air Force and Space Force service members and civilian employees, and may also change the title of any activity not statutorily designated. The secretary has several responsibilities under the Uniform Code of Military Justice (UCMJ) with respect to Air Force and Space Force service members, including the authority to convene general courts martial and to commute sentences.

The secretary of the Air Force may also be assigned additional responsibilities by the president or the secretary of defense, e.g. the secretary is designated as the "DoD Executive Agent for Space", and as such:

Office of the Secretary of the Air Force

The secretary of the Air Force's principal staff element, the Office of the Secretary of the Air Force, has responsibility for acquisition and auditing, comptroller issues (including financial management), inspector general matters, legislative affairs, and public affairs within the Department of the Air Force. The Office of the Secretary of the Air Force is one of the Department of the Air Force's three headquarter staffs at the seat of government, with the others being the Air Staff and the Office of the Chief of Space Operations.

Composition
The Office of the Secretary of the Air Force is composed of:
Under Secretary of the Air Force
The Deputy Under Secretary of the Air Force for International Affairs
The Deputy Under Secretary of the Air Force for Space Programs
Assistant Secretary of the Air Force for Acquisition, Technology and Logistics
Assistant Secretary of the Air Force for Financial Management and Comptroller
Assistant Secretary of the Air Force for Installations, Environment and Energy
Assistant Secretary of the Air Force for Manpower and Reserve Affairs
Assistant Secretary of the Air Force for Space Acquisition and Integration
General Counsel of the Department of the Air Force
Inspector General of the Air Force
Chief of Legislative Liaison
Administrative Assistant to the Secretary of the Air Force
Auditor General of the Department of the Air Force
Air Reserve Forces Policy Committee

Chronological list of secretaries of the Air Force

See also 
Department of the Air Force Decoration for Exceptional Civilian Service

References
Title 10 United States Code
Subtitle A – General Military Law
CHAPTER 1 – DEFINITIONS
§ 101. Definitions
CHAPTER 6 – COMBATANT COMMANDERS
§ 162. Combatant command: assigned forces; chain of command
Subtitle D – Air Force
CHAPTER 903 – DEPARTMENT OF THE AIR FORCE
§ 9011. Organization
§ 9013. Secretary of the Air Force
§ 9014. Office of the Secretary of the Air Force
§ 9015. Under Secretary of the Air Force
CHAPTER 905 – THE AIR STAFF
§ 9032. The Air Staff: general duties
§ 9033. Chief of Staff
Executive Order 12909, Order of Succession of Officers To Act as Secretary of the Air Force
Department of Defense Directive (DODD) 5100.1, Functions of the Department of Defense and Its Major Components, August 1 2002.
Department of Defense Directive (DODD) 5101.2, DoD Executive Agent for Space, June 3 2003.

Notes

External links
Leaders Through the Years, 2012 USAF Almanac

1947 establishments in the United States
Air
United States Air Force